Levenshulme South was a railway station in Levenshulme, Manchester, England; it was sited on the Fallowfield Loop railway line, which has since closed and is now a shared-use path.

Fallowfield Loop

History
The station opened on 2 May 1892, originally as Levenshulme; it was renamed Levenshulme South on 15 September 1952. This was one of two stations in Levenshulme; the other, Levenshulme railway station, is still is use today.

The line, and consequently the station, was closed to passenger traffic on 7 July 1958; the line continued to carry goods trains until 1987 and the track was taken up in 1988.

Today
Restoration of the station building commenced in 2018 to turn it into Station South, a cycle cafe/bar and urban garden.

The Fallowfield Loop line trackbed is now a popular shared use path for walkers and cyclists.

References

Disused railway stations in Manchester
Former Great Central Railway stations
Railway stations in Great Britain opened in 1892
Railway stations in Great Britain closed in 1958